The 1984 NCAA Division I baseball season, play of college baseball in the United States organized by the National Collegiate Athletic Association (NCAA) began in the spring of 1984.  The season progressed through the regular season and concluded with the 1984 College World Series.  The College World Series, held for the thirty eighth time in 1984, consisted of one team from each of eight regional competitions and was held in Omaha, Nebraska, at Johnny Rosenblatt Stadium as a double-elimination tournament.  Cal State Fullerton claimed the championship for the second time.

Realignment and format changes
Georgia State joined the Trans America Athletic Conference after playing three years as an independent.  The conference re-instituted divisional play after a one year absence, with Georgia Southern, Georgia State, Mercer, and Samford comprising the East and Arkansas–Little Rock, Centenary, Hardin–Simmons, Nicholls, and Northwestern making up the West.
The Association of Mid-Continent Universities added baseball with seven teams.  The first season did not include conference play, but did result in a tournament.  The teams were Cleveland State, Eastern Illinois, Northern Iowa, Southwest Missouri State, UIC, Valparaiso, and Western Illinois.

Conference winners
This is a partial list of conference champions from the 1984 season.  The NCAA sponsored regional competitions to determine the College World Series participants.  Six regionals of four teams and two of six each competed in double-elimination tournaments, with the winners advancing to Omaha.  25 teams earned automatic bids by winning their conference championship while 11 teams earned at-large selections.

Conference standings
The following is an incomplete list of conference standings:

College World Series

The 1984 season marked the thirty eighth NCAA Baseball Tournament, which culminated with the eight team College World Series.  The College World Series was held in Omaha, Nebraska.  The eight teams played a double-elimination format, with Cal State Fullerton claiming their second championship with a 3–1 win over Texas in the final.

Award winners

All-America team

References